Serratorotula coronata is a species of air-breathing land snail, terrestrial pulmonate gastropod mollusks in the family Geomitridae, the hairy snails and their allies. 

This species is endemic to Porto Santo Island, Madeira, Portugal. Its natural habitat is rocky areas. It is threatened by habitat loss.

References

Endemic fauna of Madeira
Molluscs of Madeira
Geomitridae
Gastropods described in 1850
Taxonomy articles created by Polbot
Taxobox binomials not recognized by IUCN